A hand is a body part.

Hand or HAND may also refer to:

Arts, entertainment, and media

Fictional entities
 Hand, a son of Albion in the mythology of William Blake
 Crazy Hand and Master Hand, two characters in the Super Smash Bros. series 
 King's Hand, a top advisor to a king in A Song of Fire and Ice and Game of Thrones
 The Hand (Babylon 5), an alien race in the television series Babylon 5 (1994–1997)
 The Hand (comics), an organization in the Marvel Comics universe
 The Hand, creator of Nebula Man in the DC Comics universe

Films
 The Hand (1960 film), by Henry Cass
 The Hand (1965 film), by Jiří Trnka
 The Hand (1981 film), a 1981 horror film by Oliver Stone
 The Hand, a short film by Wong Kar-Wai, part of the film Eros (2004)

Music
 "Hand", a 1999 song by Jars of Clay from the album If I Left the Zoo
 The Hand, a side project of American rock band Johnny Society

Other uses in arts, entertainment, and media
 Hand (card games)
  Hand, a style of handwriting
 The Hand (journal)
 The Hand (Botero), sculpture by Fernando Botero
 The Hand, part of the comic Shiver and Shake
 The Hand, a 1930 work by Salvador Dalí
 The Hand, a Stand used by Okuyasu Nijimura in JoJo's Bizarre Adventure: Diamond Is Unbreakable
h.a.n.d., a Japanese video game developer

Biology and healthcare
 HAND1, a human gene
 HAND2, a human gene
 HIV-associated neurocognitive disorder, or HAND

People
 Hand (surname)

Places
 Hand, South Carolina, a community in the United States
 Hand County, South Dakota, a county in the United States
 Hand Lake, a lake in Minnesota

Other uses
 Glossary of bowling § Hand, a measure of hand position in bowling ball deliveries
 Hand (hieroglyph), an alphabetic hieroglyph with the meaning of "d"
 Hand (unit), a measurement, primarily of a horse's height
 Hand, part of a clock face: hour hand, minute hand, or second hand
 ☞, hand, or index, a punctuation mark
 Hand of Eris, a symbol simply called The Hand in the religion of Discordianism

See also
 
 
 Handmade (disambiguation)
 Hands (disambiguation)
 Hand pay, a slot machine payment made by a cashier
 Handjob, a sexual term
 Handwriting, an individual's style of writing
 Justice Hand (disambiguation)
 Mr. Hand (disambiguation)